Necho may refer to:

 Necho I (died 664 BC), Egyptian pharaoh of the 26th Dynasty
 Necho II (died 595 BC), Egyptian pharaoh of the 26th Dynasty
 Necho (crater), a crater on the Moon

See also 
Neco (1895–1977), Brazilian footballer
Neco (name), including a list of people
Necco, a candy manufacturer
Northern Essex Community College, or NECCO
Neko (disambiguation)